James "Revolvers" McLain (1903 – September 23, 1934) was a member of Jack McGurn's crew, in the Chicago Outfit, and believed to be  involved in the 1929 St. Valentine's Day Massacre.

Early life
He was born Antonio Trangorello in Trapani, Sicily. His family emigrated to New York City three years later, arriving at Ellis Island on July 18, 1906. He later moved to Chicago with his family and girlfriend. One time he and a few of his friends were in a movie theater, when local Irish police raided it. He changed his name to James McLain to avoid being beaten up.

Prohibition-era
McLain took a run-in with a few Purple Gang members, They were fighting with him telling him that it was a Jewish area. One of them pulled a gun and shot at him. Both of them missed, but hit and killed his girlfriend.

McLain got back at the Purple Gang with the help of Jack "Machine Gun" McGurn. He started work in McGurn's speakeasy, the Green Mill, as a bartender. He later became involved with McGurn's crew inside the Chicago Outfit which at the time was run by Johnny Torrio and Al Capone.

McLain helped McGurn kill Frankie Yale in 1928.

St. Valentine's Day Massacre
James suspectedly helped plan the St. Valentine's Day Massacre in 1929, which was meant to bring the war of the North Side Gang to an end by killing George Moran. Six members of the North Side Gang were killed, but Moran survived. He was not suspected for the killings because a local flower shop owner claimed he was with McLain at the time.

Later years
On August 25, 1933, the Western Open golf championship began at Olympia Fields Country Club in the far south suburb of Olympia Fields, Illinois. McLain entered the competition, using his birth name. When McGurn was arrested, McLain thought it would be a good idea to leave as well, as someone could easily find out who he was.

When Frank Nitti took control of the Chicago Outfit, he didn't think McLain was going to keep his mouth shut about the happenings on St. Valentine's Day. However, Paul Ricca thought that McLain was a good assassin and gunman, so he kept him on board.

Death
On June 12, 1934 James McLain was gunned down outside his apartment in Cicero, Illinois. Louis Campagna is believed to have fired the machine gun that killed him.

1903 births
1934 deaths
People from Trapani
Al Capone associates
Murdered American gangsters of Sicilian descent
Chicago Outfit mobsters
Prohibition-era gangsters
People murdered by the Chicago Outfit
People murdered in Illinois
Male murder victims
Deaths by firearm in Illinois
Italian emigrants to the United States